The Lillafüred Forest Train is a narrow-gauge tourist railway in Hungary. The railway opened as the Lillafüredi State Forest Railway (Lillafüredi Állami Erdei Vasút or LÁEV) in 1920. It originally carried freight only (mainly wood from the forests of the Bükk Mountains) but a passenger service was introduced in the third year of operation. In 1990, the freight service was withdrawn but the railway continued to carry passengers as a tourist railway.

Route
The railway runs from Dorottya Street station in Miskolc to Garadna, deep in the Bükk Mountains.

Tourist attractions within reach
 Castle of Diósgyőr
 Zoo and Culture Park of Miskolc
 Diósgyőr Paper Mill
 Palace Hotel, Lillafüred
 Lake Hámori and waterfall
 Caves in the karstic mountain
 Fazola furnace (industrial monument)
 Trout farm

References

External links 
 Prices
 Timetable
 About the Forest Train on the official tourist portal of Miskolc
 http://www.vasutallomasok.hu/index.php?o=vonkep&num=330
 http://www.vasutallomasok.hu/index.php?o=vonkep&num=331
 http://www.vasutallomasok.hu/index.php?o=vonkep&num=331a
 http://www.vasutallomasok.hu/index.php?o=vonkep&num=331b

Rail transport in Hungary
Heritage railways in Hungary